The Pakistan Antarctic Programme, abbreviated as PAP) is a scientific administrative division of the Ministry of Science and Technology (MoST) which represents the Government of Pakistan on the continent of Antarctica. The program coordinates scientific research and operational support in the region. The program is funded by the Pakistan Science Foundation and the Ministry of Science and Technology.

Currently, the PAP maintains and controls two polar stations in the region: the Jinnah Antarctic Station (JNS), and the Polar Research Cell (PRC), which was established by the National Institute of Oceanography (NIO) to co-ordinate all Antarctic related activities.

History

The Antarctic Programme was launched by the National Institute of Oceanography (NIO), with the full support of Pakistan Navy's Naval Weapons Engineering Division (NWED). In 1991, Prime minister Nawaz Sharif established the programme under the direction of the Navy. On 15 June 1992, Pakistan became an Associate Member of the Scientific Committee on Antarctic Research, but did not accede to the Antarctic Treaty due to economic reasons.

In January 1991, Pakistan dispatched its first expedition to Greater Antarctica under the auspices of the NIO. As the programme was led by the Navy, the PN dispatched a small group of Pakistan Marines, along with the team of scientists on board the destroyer PNS Tariq and the research vessel PNS Behr Paima. Facilities were quickly established in the region, and Jinnah Antarctic Station (JNS) was commissioned. 

Pakistan's second Antarctic expedition happened in 1992 and 1993. This expedition visited the 1991 station (Jinnah I), and then went on to establish a new field station at a second location (Jinnah II). This expedition also established an unmanned automatic Weather Station at a third location (the Iqbal Observatory), from which data are transmitted to Pakistan via the Argos Satellite System. In 2001, the Badr-B was connected to the Weather Station after it was launched by SUPARCO. In 2006, Pakistan established the National Institute of Oceanography's Polar Research Cell (PRC).

A number of national organisations are involved in Antarctic activities and are active participants in the Pakistan Antarctic Programme.

Both stations' data are transmitted to Pakistan via the Badr-B Satellite. However, the new Pakistan Remote Sensing Satellite System was launched in late 2011 to replace the Badr satellite system program.

In October 2010, a source with the NIO stated that Pakistan is developing a full-fledged permanent base in Antarctica, which will allow researchers to carry out year-round operations. Then, in October 2020, the Director General of the NIO stated that while she was keen to see Pakistani researchers return to Antarctica, she considered it more feasible for them to participate in multinational Antarctic expeditions, as independent expeditions were considered too expensive.

Objectives

The main objectives of the Pakistan Antarctic Programme are to undertake multidisciplinary research and survey the Antarctic region, with particular attention to geology and geophysics. Studies also include environmental and oceanographic research.

Pakistan's research activities are in conformity with the tenets of the Scientific Committee on Antarctic Research (SCAR), of which Pakistan is an associate member. Pakistanis have gained experience and capability by launching two major expeditions, thus strengthening Pakistan's ability to conduct research in the harsh Antarctic environment. Apart from this, useful environmental and oceanographic data has been collected in the region, and relevant technical information on Antarctic affairs has been provided to the Pakistani government.

Stations

Pakistan maintains two summer research stations and one weather observatory in the vicinity of the Sør Rondane Mountains, Queen Maud Land, in Eastern Antarctica. The Jinnah Antarctic Station is the centre of most operations, and travel to and from Antarctica is done through the airfield at the JAS.

The NIO expressed interest in establishing a perennial Antarctic station in October 2010, but as of March 2023 the plans have not been realised.

References

External links
Antarctic Research National Institute of Oceanography, Karachi

 
Science and technology in Pakistan
Science and technology in Antarctica
Nawaz Sharif administration
Naval operations involving Pakistan
P